Nonabine (BRL-4664) is an experimental drug which is a synthetic THC analog.  It was studied in the 1980s for the prevention of nausea and vomiting associated with cancer chemotherapy but was never marketed. It has strong antiemetic effects equivalent to those of chlorpromazine, and also produces some mild sedative effects, along with dry mouth and EEG changes typical of cannabinoid agonists, but with minimal changes in mood or perception, suggesting the abuse potential is likely to be low.

References 

Antiemetics
Cannabinoids
4-Pyridyl compounds
Phenols
Benzopyrans
Abandoned drugs